Fagor was a Spanish professional cycling team that existed from 1966 to 1969. Its main sponsor was Spanish domestic and commercial appliance manufacturer Fagor.

References

External links

Defunct cycling teams based in Spain
1966 establishments in Spain
1969 disestablishments in Spain
Cycling teams established in 1966
Cycling teams disestablished in 1969